Manic Street Preachers, also known simply as the Manics, are a Welsh rock band formed in Blackwood in 1986. The band consists of cousins James Dean Bradfield (lead vocals, lead guitar) and Sean Moore (drums, percussion, soundscapes), plus Nicky Wire (bass guitar, lyrics). They form a key part of the 1990s Welsh Cool Cymru cultural movement.

Following the release of their debut single "Suicide Alley", Manic Street Preachers were joined by Richey Edwards as co-lyricist and rhythm guitarist, the band became as a quartet. The band's early albums were in a punk vein, eventually broadening to a greater alternative rock sound, whilst retaining a leftist political outlook. Their early combination of androgynous glam imagery and lyrics about "culture, alienation, boredom and despair" gained them a loyal following.

Manic Street Preachers released their debut album, Generation Terrorists, in February 1992, followed by Gold Against The Soul in 1993 and The Holy Bible in 1994. Edwards disappeared in February 1995 and was legally presumed dead in 2008. The band continued as a trio, and achieved commercial success with the albums Everything Must Go (1996) and This Is My Truth Tell Me Yours (1998).

The Manics have headlined festivals including Glastonbury, T in the Park, V Festival and Reading. They have won eleven NME Awards, eight Q Awards and four BRIT Awards. They were nominated for the Mercury Prize in 1996 and 1999, and have had one nomination for the MTV Europe Music Awards. They have reached number 1 in the UK charts four times: in 1998, with This Is My Truth Tell Me Yours and the single "If You Tolerate This Your Children Will Be Next", in 2000 with the single "The Masses Against the Classes", and in 2021 with The Ultra Vivid Lament. They have sold more than ten million albums worldwide.

History

Formation and early years (1986–1991) 
Manic Street Preachers formed in 1986 at Oakdale Comprehensive School, Blackwood, South Wales, which all the band members attended. Bradfield and the slightly older Moore are cousins and shared bunk beds in the Bradfield family home after Moore's parents divorced.

During the band's early years, Bradfield, alongside the classically trained Moore, primarily wrote the music while Wire focused on the lyrics. The origin of the band's name remains unclear, but the most often-told story relates that Bradfield while busking one day in Cardiff, got into an altercation with someone (sometimes said to be a homeless man) who asked him "What are you, boyo, some kind of manic street preacher?"

Original bassist Flicker (Miles Woodward) left the band in early 1988, reportedly because he believed that the band were moving away from their punk roots. The band continued as a three-piece, with Wire switching from guitar to bass, and in 1988 they released their first single, "Suicide Alley". Despite its recording quality, this punk ode to youthful escape provides an early insight into both Bradfield's guitar work and Moore's live drumming, the latter of which would be absent from the band's first LP. The Manics intended to restore revolution to rock and roll at a time when Britain was dominated by shoegaze and acid house. The NME gave "Suicide Alley" an enthusiastic review, citing a press release by Richey Edwards: "We are as far away from anything in the '80s as possible."

After the release of "Suicide Alley," Edwards joined the band on rhythm guitar and contributed to lyrics alongside Wire. Edwards also designed record sleeves and artwork and drove the band to and from gigs.

In 1990 the Manic Street Preachers signed a deal with label Damaged Goods Records for one EP. The four-track New Art Riot E.P. attracted as much media interest for its attacks on fellow musicians as for the actual music. With the help of Hall or Nothing management, the Manics signed to indie label Heavenly Records. The band recorded their first single for the label, entitled "Motown Junk".

Their next single, "You Love Us", sampled Krzysztof Penderecki's "Threnody to the Victims of Hiroshima" as well as Iggy Pop. The video featured Nicky Wire in drag as Marilyn Monroe and contained visual references to the film Betty Blue and to Aleister Crowley. In an interview with then-NME journalist Steve Lamacq, Edwards carved the phrase "4REAL" into his arm with a razor blade to prove their sincerity. He was taken to hospital and received seventeen stitches. NME subsequently ran a full-page story on the incident, including a phone interview with Richey on his motivations for doing it. A recording of the editorial meeting discussing whether or not they could publish the image was included as a b-side on the band's 1992 charity single Theme from M.A.S.H. (Suicide Is Painless), featuring Lamacq, the then-editor of NME Danny Kelly and James Brown (who went on to edit Loaded and the British version of GQ).

As a result of their controversial behaviour, the Manics quickly became favourites of the British music press, which helped them build a rabidly dedicated following.
Columbia Records of Sony Music UK signed the band shortly afterwards and they began work on their debut album.

Richey Edwards era: Generation Terrorists to The Holy Bible (1992–1995) 

The band's debut album, Generation Terrorists, was released in 1992 on the Columbia Records imprint. The liner notes contained a literary quote for each of the album's eighteen songs and the album lasted just over seventy minutes. The album's lyrics are politicised like those of the Clash and Public Enemy, with the album's songs regularly switching from a critical focus on global capitalism to more personal tales of despair and the struggles of youth. About the musical style of the album Pitchfork writer Joe Tangari wrote that Generation Terrorists "walked a weird line between agit-punk, cock rock, romantic melodicism and glam, and was so obviously patterned after the Clash's London Calling that it was actually kind of cute."

Other tracks combine personal and political themes, implicating a connection between global capitalism and personal struggle; "Nat West-Barclays-Midlands-Lloyds" was written as a critique of overseas banking credit policies, but also concerned Richey Edwards' issues involving overdrafts and refused loans. Marc Burrows of Drowned in Sound considered the song to be an accurate prediction of "global financial meltdown" and its effects on everyday life. The single "Motorcycle Emptiness", meanwhile, criticises consumerism as a "shallow dream" that makes human life overtly commercialised. "Little Baby Nothing", a duet between Traci Lords and Bradfield, was described by Priya Elan of the NME as a "perfect snapshot of [female] innocence bodysnatched and twisted".

The record contained six singles and sold 250,000 copies. The success of 1996's Everything Must Go at the 1997 Brit Awards ensured that sales of Generation Terrorists and subsequent albums Gold Against the Soul and The Holy Bible enjoyed a late surge; the band's debut sold an extra 110,000 copies. The band also made a cover version of the song "Suicide Is Painless" which peaked at number 7 in the UK charts, spending 3 weeks in the Top 10, and giving the band their first ever Top 10 hit single.

The group's second album, Gold Against the Soul, displayed a more commercial, grungy sound which served to alienate both fans and the band itself. It was released to mixed reviews but still performed well, reaching number eight in the UK album chart. The album presents a different sound from their debut album, not only in terms of lyrics but in sound, the band privileged long guitar riffs, and the drums themselves feel more present and loud in the final mix of the album. This sound would be abandoned in their next album and as for the nature of the lyrics they also changed, with Edwards and Wire eschewing their political fire for introspective melancholy. According to AllMusic, the album "takes the hard rock inclinations of Generation Terrorists to an extreme."

The band also stated that the choice to work with Dave Eringa again was important for this album: "We finished work in November and then just went straight into a demo studio and we came out about four weeks later with the album all finished. We were all happy with all the songs, we knew what they wanted to sound like, so we didn't want to use a mainstream producer because they've got their own sound and vision of what a record should be like. So we just phoned Dave up and said 'Look, come down, let's see how this works out', and everyone loved what we were doing, so we decided to stay with him."

The band have described Gold Against the Soul as their least favourite album and the period surrounding the album as being the most unfocused of their career. The band's vocalist and guitarist James Dean Bradfield has said "All we wanted to do was go under the corporate wing. We thought we could ignore it but you do get affected."

By early 1994, Edwards' difficulties became worse and began to affect the other band members as well as himself. He was admitted into The Priory in 1994 to overcome his problems and the band played a few festivals as a three-piece to pay for his treatment.

The group's next album, The Holy Bible, was released in August to critical acclaim, but sold poorly. The album displayed yet another musical and aesthetic change for the band, largely featuring army/navy uniforms. Musically, The Holy Bible marks a shift from the modern rock sound of their first two albums, Generation Terrorists and Gold Against the Soul. In addition to the album's alternative rock sound the album incorporates various elements from other musical genres, such as hard rock, British punk, post-punk, new wave, industrial, art rock and gothic rock.

Lyrically the album deals with subjects including prostitution, American consumerism, British imperialism, freedom of speech, the Holocaust, self-starvation, serial killers, the death penalty, political revolution, childhood, fascism and suicide. According to Q: "the tone of the album is by turns bleak, angry and resigned". There was also an element of autobiographic subjects, like in the song "4st 7lb" where the lyrics clearly tackle Richey's own experience and life.

The title "The Holy Bible" was chosen by Edwards to reflect an idea, according to Bradfield, that "everything on there has to be perfection". Interviewed at the end of 1994, Edwards said: "The way religions choose to speak their truth to the public has always been to beat them down [...] I think that if a Holy Bible is true, it should be about the way the world is and that's what I think my lyrics are about. [The album] doesn't pretend things don't exist".

Ben Patashnik of Drowned in Sound later said that the album in the time of its release "didn't sell very well, but its impact was felt keenly by anyone who'd ever come into contact with the Manics", and that it is now a "masterpiece [...] the sound of one man in a close-knit group of friends slowly disintegrating and using his own anguish to create some of the most brilliant art to be released on a large scale as music in years [...] It's not a suicide note; it's a warning."

In support of the album the band appeared on Top of the Pops, performing its first single, "Faster", which reached No. 16. The performance was extremely controversial at the time, as the band were all dressed in army regalia. Bradfield wore a "terrorist-style" balaclava. At the time, the band was told by the BBC that they had received the most complaints ever. The album eventually has sold over 600,000 copies worldwide and is frequently listed among the greatest records ever recorded.

In April and May 1994 the band first performed songs from The Holy Bible at concerts in Thailand and Portugal and at a benefit concert for the Anti-Nazi League at Brockwell Park, London. In June, they played the Glastonbury Festival. In July and August, without Richey Edwards, they played T in the Park in Scotland, the Alte Wartesaal in Cologne, the Parkpop Festival in The Hague and the Reading Festival. During September, October and December there was a headline tour of the UK and Ireland and two tours in mainland Europe with Suede and Therapy?. In December, three nights at the London Astoria ended with the band smashing up their equipment and the venue's lighting rig, causing £26,000 worth of damage.

Edwards disappeared on 1 February 1995, on the day when he and James Dean Bradfield were due to fly to the US on a promotional tour. In the two weeks before his disappearance, Edwards withdrew £200 a day from his bank account, which totalled £2,800 by the day of the scheduled flight. He checked out of the Embassy Hotel in Bayswater Road, London, at seven in the morning, and then drove to his apartment in Cardiff, Wales. In the two weeks that followed he was apparently spotted in the Newport passport office, and the Newport bus station. On 7 February, a taxi driver from Newport supposedly picked up Edwards from the King's Hotel in Newport, and drove him around the valleys, including Blackwood (Edwards' home as a child). The passenger got off at the Severn View service station near Aust and paid the £68 fare in cash.

On 14 February, Edwards' Vauxhall Cavalier received a parking ticket at the Severn View service station and on 17 February, the vehicle was reported as abandoned. Police discovered the battery to be flat, with evidence that the car had been lived in. Due to the service station's proximity to the Severn Bridge (which has been a renowned suicide location in the past) it was widely believed that he took his own life by jumping from the bridge. Many people who knew him, however, have said that he was never the type to contemplate suicide and he was quoted in 1994 as saying "In terms of the 'S' word, that does not enter my mind. And it never has done, in terms of an attempt. Because I am stronger than that. I might be a weak person, but I can take pain."

Since then he has reportedly been spotted in a market in Goa, India, and on the islands of Fuerteventura and Lanzarote. There have been other alleged sightings of Edwards, especially in the years immediately following his disappearance. However, none of these has proved conclusive and none has been confirmed by investigators. He has not been seen since.

Manic Street Preachers was put on hold for six months and disbanding the group was seriously considered, but with the blessing of Edwards' family, the other members continued. Edwards was legally "presumed dead" in 2008, to enable his parents to administer his estate. The band continue to set up a microphone for Edwards at every live performance.

Everything Must Go to Lifeblood (1996–2006) 
The first album without Edwards, Everything Must Go, was released on 20 May 1996. The band had chosen to work with new producer Mike Hedges, mainly for his work on Siouxsie and the Banshees' single "Swimming Horses" that Bradfield rated highly. Hedges had already been approached before to produce The Holy Bible but he wasn't available at the time. Everything Must Go debuted on the UK Albums Chart at number 2, so far the album has gone Triple Platinum in the UK and is their most successful album to date, spending 103 weeks in the Top 100 with the album still in the Top 5 a year after its release. Containing five songs either written or co-written by Edwards the album was released to overwhelmingly positive reviews. Lyrically the themes were different from their previous effort, instead of introspective and autobiographical tracks such as "4st 7lb", Wire's predilection for historical and political themes dominates, like the No. 2 hit single "A Design for Life". The song was the first to be written and released by the band following the mysterious disappearance of figurehead Richey Edwards the previous year and was used as the opening track on Forever Delayed, the band's greatest hits album released in November 2002.

James Dean Bradfield later recalled that the lyric had been a fusion of two sets of lyrics-"Design for Life" and "Pure Motive"-sent to him from Wales by bassist Nicky Wire, while he was living in Shepherd's Bush. The music was written "in about ten minutes" and Bradfield felt a sense of euphoria with the result. The song was credited with having "rescued the band" from the despair felt after the disappearance of Edwards, with Wire describing the song as "a bolt of light from a severely dark place". The album was shortlisted for the 1996 Mercury Prize award for best album and won the band two Brit Awards for Best British Band and Best British Album, as well as yielding the hit singles "Australia", "Everything Must Go" and "Kevin Carter".

Subjects tackled on the album include the tragic life of the photographer Kevin Carter, on the track of the same name, Willem de Kooning and the maltreatment of animals in captivity on "Small Black Flowers That Grow in the Sky" (which is a quote from the film The Best Years of Our Lives). The latter track, with lyrics by Edwards, can also be interpreted as an exploration of his mental state before his disappearance; the line "Here chewing your tail is joy" for instance may be as much about Richey's self-harm as it is the tormented self-injury of zoo animals. It was their most direct and mature record to date and it established the Manics as superstars throughout the world.

The album has sold over two million copies around the world, and it is still considered one of the finest releases of the decade, a classic album from the 1990s and frequently voted in polls in the category of best albums of all time by many publications.

In 1997 the band performed a special gig at the Manchester Arena for more than 20,000 people. Bassist Nicky Wire said that was the moment he knew that the band had "made it". The recording was released as a VHS video on 29 September 1997 and has only been reissued on DVD in Japan.

This Is My Truth Tell Me Yours (1998) was the first number 1 of the band in the UK, remaining at the top of the albums chart for 3 weeks, selling 136,000 copies in the first week and spending a total of 74 weeks in the Album Chart. The title is a quotation taken from a speech given by Aneurin Bevan, a Labour Party politician from Wales. Its working title was simply Manic Street Preachers. The cover photograph was taken on Black Rock Sands near Porthmadog, Wales. Around the world the album also peaked at number 1 in countries like Sweden and Ireland, and it sold over five million copies worldwide.

With their fifth album, the group also had a No. 1 single, "If You Tolerate This Your Children Will Be Next". The song's theme is taken from the Spanish Civil War, and the idealism of Welsh volunteers who joined the left-wing International Brigades fighting for the Spanish Republic against Francisco Franco's military rebels. The song takes its name from a Republican poster of the time, displaying a photograph of a young child killed by the Nationalists under a sky of bombers with the stark warning "If you tolerate this, your children will be next" written at the bottom. The song is in the Guinness World Records as the number one single with the longest title without brackets. The album also included the hit singles "You Stole the Sun from My Heart", "Tsunami" and "The Everlasting". The Manics won Best British Band and Album awards at the BRIT Awards in 1999. This Is My Truth Tell Me Yours was also shortlisted for the 1999 Mercury Prize and the band received a further nomination in the category of Best UK & Ireland Act in the 1999 MTV Europe Music Awards, where the band performed live the single If You Tolerate This Your Children Will Be Next. In the NME Awards in 1999, the band won every single big prize, Best Band, Best Album, Best Live Act, Best Single and Best Video, nailing also the prize for Best Band in the World Today in the Q Awards 1998.

After headlining Glastonbury Festival, T in the Park and V Festival, the band played the Leaving the 20th Century concert at the Millennium Stadium in Cardiff on 31 December 1999, the first concert to be held there, with 57,000 people attending and the final song being broadcast around the world by satellite as part of 2000 Today. The concert is available on VHS and DVD. Subtitled English lyrics, available as an extra, contain errors when compared to the official lyrics in the band's album booklets and in between some of the tracks there are interview clips where the band discusses their history and the songs.

In 2000, they released the limited edition single "The Masses Against the Classes". Despite receiving little promotion, the single sold 76,000 copies in its first week and reached number one in the UK Singles Chart on 16 January 2000, beating "U Know What's Up" by Donell Jones to the top. The catalogue entry for the single was deleted (removed from wholesale supply) on the day of release, but the song nevertheless spent 9 weeks in the UK chart.

In 2001, they became the first popular Western rock band to play in Cuba (at the Karl Marx Theatre) and met with President Fidel Castro. Their concert and trip to Cuba was documented and then released as a DVD entitled Louder Than War. At this concert, they revealed many tracks from their upcoming sixth album, Know Your Enemy, which was released on 19 March. The left-wing political convictions of the Manic Street Preachers are apparent in many of the album's songs, such as "Baby Elián" as they comment on the strained relations between the United States and Cuba as seen in the Elián González affair, a hot topic around the album's release.

The band also pays tribute to singer and civil rights activist Paul Robeson in the song "Let Robeson Sing", but the song "Ocean Spray", which was a single, was written entirely by James about his mother's battle with cancer. The first singles from the album, "So Why So Sad" and "Found That Soul", were both released on the same day. The final single "Let Robeson Sing" was released later. The Manics also headlined Reading and Leeds Festival.

The greatest hits (plus remixes) album Forever Delayed was released in 2002, containing two new songs, "Door to the River" and the single "There by the Grace of God". Several songs were edited for length ("Motorcycle Emptiness," "You Love Us", "Australia," "Everything Must Go," "Little Baby Nothing," and "The Everlasting") so that more tracks could fit onto the CD (though not listed as edits in the liner notes).

The Forever Delayed DVD was released in 2002 together with the greatest hits CD and photo book that bear the same name, and features all the promo music videos from the start of the band's career released before the DVD. Along with the promo videos, there is a selection of 14 remix videos, where the visual material is taken from clips of the other promo videos as well as backdrop visuals from the band's live concerts.
The album peaked and debuted on the UK Albums Chart at #4.

An album of B-sides, rarities, and cover versions was released in 2003 entitled Lipstick Traces (A Secret History of Manic Street Preachers), which contains the last song the band worked on with Edwards. The album received a far more positive reception from fans than the Forever Delayed greatest hits album, which was heavily criticised for favouring the band's more commercially successful singles. The only recurring criticism of Lipstick Traces was the exclusion of the fan favourite "Patrick Bateman", from the "La Tristesse Durera (Scream to a Sigh)" single. The band explained that it was excluded mainly because it was almost seven minutes long and simply would not fit on the album.

The band's seventh studio album, Lifeblood, was released on 1 November 2004 and reached No. 13 on the UK album chart. Critical response to the album was mixed. The album was more introspective and more focused on the past, Wire talked about the ghosts that haunted this record and stated that the record was a retrospective: "The main themes are death and solitude and ghosts. Being haunted by history and being haunted by your own past. Sleep is beautiful for me. I hate dreaming because it ruins ten hours of bliss. I had a lot of bad dreams when Richey first disappeared. Not ugly dreams, but nagging things. Until we wrote 'Design for Life', it was six months of misery. Lifeblood doesn't seek to exorcise Edwards' ghost, though, just admits that there are no answers". Tony Visconti helped the band produce three songs on the album, which was followed by a UK arena tour in December 2004. "Empty Souls" and "The Love of Richard Nixon" were the two singles released from the album, both reaching No. 2 in the UK.

A tenth-anniversary edition of The Holy Bible was released on 6 December 2004, which included a digitally remastered version of the original album, a rare U.S. mix (which the band themselves have admitted to preferring to the original UK mix) and a DVD of live performances and extras including a band interview.

In April 2005, the band played several shows as the Past-Present-Future tour—announced as their last for at least two years. The band released an EP entitled God Save the Manics with only a limited number of copies available and given out to fans as they arrived at the venue. After all the copies were gone, the band made the EP available as a free download on their website. In September, the band contributed the new track "Leviathan" to the War Child charity album Help!: A Day in the Life.

In 2006 the band received the prize for the Q Merit Award in the Q Awards 2006 and also the 10th-anniversary edition of Everything Must Go was released on 6 November. It included the original album, demos, B-sides, remixes, rehearsals and alternate takes of the album's songs, spread out over two CDs. An additional DVD, featuring music videos, live performances, TV appearances, a 45-minute documentary on the making of the album, and two films by Patrick Jones, completed the three-disc set.

In the 10th-anniversary edition, the band itself claims that they're still fond of the record, and Wire goes further saying: "I think it's our best record, I am not afraid to say that."

Send Away the Tigers to National Treasures (2007–2012) 

The band's eighth studio album, Send Away the Tigers, was released on 7 May 2007 on Columbia Records. It entered the official UK album charts at No. 2. Critical response to the album was largely positive, with some critics hailing the album as the band's best in a decade. A free download of a song entitled "Underdogs" from the album was made available through the group's website on 19 March 2007.

The first official single released from Send Away the Tigers was "Your Love Alone Is Not Enough", which features Cardigans vocalist Nina Persson and according to the band they always had a duet in mind, seeing that the lyrics have a question/reply style to it. According to singer Bradfield, the title was the last line of a suicide note left by the friend of someone close to the group. The second single, "Autumnsong", and a third, "Indian Summer", were released in August. "Indian Summer" peaked at number 22, making it the first Manics single not to chart in the Top 20 since 1994's "She Is Suffering". The album sleeve features a quotation from Wyndham Lewis: "When a man is young, he is usually a revolutionary of some kind. So here I am, speaking of my revolution".

The band ended up promoting the album with appearances in the summer festivals like Reading and Leeds Festivals and Glastonbury Festival.

The band released a Christmas single, "The Ghosts of Christmas", in December. The track was available as a free download on their official website throughout December 2007 and January 2008. In February 2008, the band were presented with the God-Like Geniuses Award at the NME Awards ceremony.

The ninth Manics album, Journal for Plague Lovers, was released on 18 May 2009 and features lyrics left behind by Edwards. Wire commented in an interview that "there was a sense of responsibility to do his words justice." The album was released to positive critical reviews and reached No. 3 on the UK Album Chart. However, the cover of the album generated some controversy, with the top four UK supermarkets stocking the CD in a plain slipcase, as the cover was deemed "inappropriate". Bradfield regarded the decision as "utterly bizarre", and has commented: "You can have lovely shiny buttocks and guns everywhere in the supermarket on covers of magazines and CDs, but you show a piece of art and people just freak out."

Several tracks refer to Edwards' time in a couple of hospitals in 1994. Among them is "She Bathed Herself in a Bath of Bleach", of which James Dean Bradfield said to the NME: "There're some people he met when he was in one of the two places having treatment and I think he just digested other people's stories and experiences." The final track, "William's Last Words", has been compared to a suicide note, and although Nicky Wire rejects this suggestion, Bradfield observes, "you can draw some pretty obvious conclusions from the lyrics." Wire, who admitted finding the task of editing this song "pretty choking", eventually composed the music and sang lead vocals after Bradfield found himself unsuited to the task.

Bradfield commented that Journal for Plague Lovers was an attempt to finally secure the legacy of their former member Richey Edwards and the result was that, during the recording process, it was as close to feeling his presence since his disappearance: "There was a sense of responsibility to do his words justice. That was part of the whole thing of letting enough time lapse. Once we actually got into the studio, it almost felt as if we were a full band; it [was] as close to him being in the room again as possible."

Tracks from Journal for Plague Lovers have been remixed by a number of artists, and the Journal for Plague Lovers Remixes EP was released on 15 June 2009. Martin Noble of the band British Sea Power remixed the song "Me and Stephen Hawking"; Andrew Weatherall remixed "Peeled Apples", which he has described as "sounding like Charlie Watts playing with PiL"; The Horrors remixed "Doors Closing Slowly"; NYPC remixed the song "Marlon J.D" and the EP also features remixes by Patrick Wolf, Underworld, Four Tet, Errors, Adem, Optimo and Fuck Buttons.

On 18 June 2009, the Manics officially opened the new Cardiff Central Library. Wire later said in an interview with The Guardian that the occasion had been a great honour for the band:

On 1 June 2010, the band announced on their homepage that a new album called Postcards from a Young Man would be released on 20 September. James Dean Bradfield said that the album would be an unashamedly pop-orientated affair, following 2009's Journal for Plague Lovers. "We're going for big radio hits on this one", he told NME. "It isn't a follow-up to Journal for Plague Lovers. It's one last shot at mass communication."

On 26 July, the first single from the new album, "(It's Not War) Just the End of Love", was played on the breakfast shows of BBC Radio 2, BBC 6Music, XFm and Absolute Radio. It was released on 13 September. The title had previously been suggested as a working title for the album by Nicky Wire. Three collaborations were also confirmed on the band's website later that day: Duff McKagan would appear on "A Billion Balconies Facing the Sun", Ian McCulloch will add guest vocals to "Some Kind of Nothingness" and John Cale will feature on "Auto-Intoxication". Of the album's lead single, "(It's Not War) Just the End of Love," Nicky Wire claimed: "I believe in the tactile nature of rock 'n' roll. There's a generation missing out on what music meant to us...You can only elaborate on the stuff that compels you to. But "It's Not War..." is kind of saying, "Alright, we're not 18, but even at 40 the rage is still there".

Postcards from a Young Man was recorded with producer (and longtime Manics collaborator) Dave Eringa and was mixed in America by Chris Lord-Alge. It was released in a standard version, 2 CD deluxe version, and limited edition box set. The album cover art uses a black and white photograph of British actor Tim Roth.

The album was supported by the Manics' most extensive tour of the UK to date, starting in Glasgow on 29 September 2010. British Sea Power were the support act for the band on the tour. Two further singles were released from the album—the McCulloch-featuring "Some Kind of Nothingness" and the title track "Postcards from a Young Man". "Some Kind of Nothingness" peaked at No. 44 in the UK making it the first-ever Manics single to not make the Top 40 since they signed to Sony in 1991.

The band initially announced that their next album had the working title 70 Songs of Hatred and Failure and would sound very different from Postcards From A Young Man: "The next album will be pure indulgence. There's only so much melody stored in your body that you can physically get onto one record. It was just so utterly commercial and melodic." However, Nicky Wire contradicted this in 2011 while doing promotion for their greatest hits compilation National Treasures. When asked why the band was releasing the compilation Wire stated: "It's just the end of an era. Not the end of a band. We're gonna disappear for quite a long time."

National Treasures – The Complete Singles was released on 31 October 2011, preceded by the release of the single "This Is the Day", a cover of the song by The The. On 17 December 2011, the group performed 'A Night of National Treasures' at O2 Arena in London to celebrate the band's 25 years to date, and enter into a period of hiatus where the eleventh album was written. The band performed all 38 singles, with around 20,000 people in attendance, as well as guest performers including Nina Persson from the Cardigans who sings with the band on the single "Your Love Alone Is Not Enough" and Gruff Rhys from Super Furry Animals who sang with the band that night on the track Let Robeson Sing. In April and May 2012, the band embarked on a European greatest hits tour. The compilation was voted by NME magazine as the best re issue of 2011, beating Nirvana's deluxe and super deluxe edition of Nevermind to the top spot.

Despite the "complete singles" title, National Treasures does not contain every Manic Street Preachers single. Notable omissions are the band's very first single, "Suicide Alley" (1989), "Strip It Down" from the New Art Riot EP (1990), for which the band's first promotional video was made, and "You Love Us (Heavenly Version)" (1991). For singles originally released as double-A sides, only one song is included: therefore from "Love's Sweet Exile/Repeat" (1992) and "Faster/P.C.P." (1994), only the first of each pair are included.

On 10 October the band announced via Facebook that a film-interview-documentary about their album Generation Terrorists would be screened at 2012's  Festival as a Welsh exclusive. The film was shown at Chapter Arts Centre on Saturday 20 October, with all profits being donated to Young Promoters Network. The film was made available in the 20th-anniversary re-issue of Generation Terrorists, of which there were five editions:

 Single Disc edition: Original Album
 2 Disc Deluxe edition: Includes Original Album + Demos with DVD of Culture, Alienation, Boredom, Despair (A making of the album)
 4 Disc Limited edition (3,000 copies worldwide): Includes Original Album, Demos, B-Sides, Rarities, CABD DVD + Replica of Generation Terrorist Tour VIP Pass, 10" Collage by Richey Edwards, 10" Vinyl LP of a rare Manics Radio Performance and a 28-page book from Nicky Wire's archive.

Also, if the Deluxe edition was purchased from the London record store "Rough Trade", then alongside the £20 purchase came a free ticket to see a showing of the CABD film, followed by an acoustic gig with James Dean Bradfield on 6 November.

Rewind the Film to The Ultra Vivid Lament (2013–present) 
In May 2013, the band announced an Australasian tour for June and July, that would see them play their first-ever show in New Zealand. This tour coincided with the British and Irish Lions rugby tour to Australia and the Melbourne concert on the eve of the 2nd Test featured Lions' centre Jamie Roberts as a guest guitarist on "You Love Us".

In May 2013 the Manics released information about their most recent recording sessions, saying that they had enough material for two albums; the first would be almost exclusively without electric guitars. The name of the first album and title track was revealed to be Rewind the Film on 8 July. In a statement, the band announced, "(If) this record has a relation in the Manics back catalogue, it's probably the sedate coming of age that was This Is My Truth Tell Me Yours." The band also stated via Twitter, "MSP were in the great Hansa Studios in January with Alex Silva (who recorded The Holy Bible with us). Berlin was inspirational... Sean been playing a french horn in the studio today—sounding wonderful."

The lead single of the album, "Show Me the Wonder", was referred to on their Twitter account, the Manics posted, "I think 'show me the wonder' is the 1st ever manics single without JDBs electric guitar on-xx." The single was released on 9 September 2013 to a positive critical reception. The album itself was released on 16 September 2013 and reached No. 4 on the UK Album Chart. The second single of the album "Anthem for a Lost Cause" was released on 25 November 2013.

The other album, Futurology, the band's twelfth studio album, was released on 7 July 2014 and it received immediate critical acclaim. The lead single from the album, "Walk Me to the Bridge", was released as a digital download on the day of the announcement, on 28 April.

Futurology, according to the band, is an album full of ideas and one of their most optimistic yet, as Wire said to the NME magazine in an interview: "There's an overriding concept behind 'Futurology' which is to express all the inspiration we get from travel, music and art—all those ideas, do that in a positive way. 'Rewind The Film' was a harrowing 45-year-old looking in the mirror, lyrically. 'Futurology' was very much an album of ideas. It's one of our most optimistic records, the idea that any kind of art can transport you to a different universe."

The album sold about 20,000 copies in its first week and reached No. 2 on the UK Albums Chart. The title track, "Futurology", was the second and final single released from the album on 22 September, the video debuted on YouTube on 10 August. The video was directed by the British Academy of Film and Television Arts winner Kieran Evans, who worked with the band on videos from their previous effort Rewind The Film. The band promoted the album with a tour around the UK and Europe from March to May 2014, they also made appearances in festivals like T in the Park in Scotland and Glastonbury Festival in the summer.

Late in 2014, the band celebrated the release of their seminal album The Holy Bible with a special edition in December, commemorating the 20th anniversary of the album. This edition includes the vinyl edition of the full album, plus a three-CD set, the first CD with the full album remastered for the special release, the second with the US mix remastered and the third including a performance at the Astoria in 1994 and an acoustic session for Radio 4 Mastertapes in 2014. The special edition also contains a 40-page book full of rare photos and handwritten lyrics and notes by Richey and by the band. In the NME Awards 2015, the album won "Reissue of the Year".

They also toured the album, playing it in full for the very first time. After the tour in the UK, the Manics took The Holy Bible tour to North America, in April 2015, they played in Washington DC, Toronto, New York, Boston, San Francisco, Los Angeles and Chicago. They also played in the Cardiff Castle on 5 June 2015 with 10,000 fans attending the gig, it was broadcast nationwide by BBC Two Wales.

In August 2015 the Manic Street Preachers nailed the 2 top spots on the best NME covers of all time, as voted by the general public.

James Dean Bradfield and Sean Moore in November 2015 did a charity hike in Patagonia, Nicky Wire did not participate in the event, the band said: "In November 2015 we will be walking in the footsteps of our Welsh ancestors when we will be part of the Velindre group of 50 people celebrating the 150th anniversary of Welsh settlers arriving in Patagonia with a challenging six-day trek."

Also in November 2015, the Manic Street Preachers announced that they were going to celebrate the 20th anniversary of their 1996 album Everything Must Go, with their biggest headline show since 1999, in the Liberty Stadium, in Swansea on 28 May 2016, featuring special guests like Super Furry Animals. The album was performed in full, with Nicky Wire teasing "b-sides, rarities and curios, greatest hits and a few brand-new songs". Before the final show in Swansea the band played: Liverpool, Echo Arena (13 May), Birmingham, Genting Arena (14 May), London, Royal Albert Hall (16–17 May), Leeds, First Direct Arena (20 May) and Glasgow, the SSE Hydro (21 May). In early 2016 the band announced the European tour of "Everything Must Go", they played across Europe, in Finland, Denmark, the Netherlands and Germany. Similar to what happened with "The Holy Bible" the Manics released on 20 May, a special anniversary edition for the album, which includes the full album remastered plus the B-sides, a heavyweight vinyl, the 1997 Nynex concert fully restored on DVD, a film about the making of the album, the official videos for the all singles and a 40-page booklet. It was also made available a standard edition with a double-CD featuring only the remastered album and the concert at the Nynex Arena.

The band announced in March 2016 that they would be releasing a theme song for the Wales national team ahead of the UEFA Euro 2016 tournament in the summer, entitled "Together Stronger (C'mon Wales)", it was released on 20 May, featuring also a video with the band and the Welsh team, the Manics tweeted: "It's with great pride we can announce the Manics are providing the official Wales Euro 2016 song – 'Together Stronger (C'mon Wales)'". All profits from the song went to the Princes Gate Trust and Tenovus Cancer Care. On 8 July the band was at the Cardiff City Stadium to give a home welcome to the Wales football national team after they were knocked out of the UEFA Euro 2016 by Portugal in the semi-finals, the band played a few songs in the stadium including the official theme song "Together Stronger (C'mon Wales)". On the next night, 9 July, the Manics headlined a night at the Cornwall's Eden Project, and later the band managed to secure a new recording studio near Newport, Wales. The city's council ensured that only the band can use the studio, there would be an increase on-site parking and a series of soundproofing measures to ensure nearby properties aren't disturbed by noise. To end the summer, the Manics went on to headline another two festivals, Wasa Open Air in Finland in mid-August and in late August the Victorious Festival in Portsmouth. The band also received a nomination in the 25th British Academy Cymru Awards for the best live outside broadcast after their 2015 gig in the Cardiff Castle, celebrating the 20th anniversary of the "Holy Bible".

In February 2017 the band revealed a teaser trailer for a documentary entitled Escape from History, charting the band's journey from The Holy Bible, through to the disappearance of lyricist and guitarist Richey Edwards, to the huge success of Everything Must Go. The documentary aired on Sky Arts on 15 April. The band also stated that they would release an album later in that year.

The band released a special edition of their album Send Away the Tigers on 12 May. 2017 marks the 10th anniversary of the record and the Manics said that "this is a very important album" in their career. The special edition featured a remastered album as well as B-sides and rarities spread over two discs, plus a DVD which features the band's 2007 Glastonbury performance, rehearsal footage, an album track-by-track, and promo videos.

On 17 November 2017, the band announced that their thirteenth album, Resistance Is Futile, would be released on 13 April 2018. After much delay, the band wrote "The main themes of 'Resistance is Futile' are memory and loss; forgotten history; confused reality and art as a hiding place and inspiration", the band say in a statement. "It's obsessively melodic—in many ways referencing both the naive energy of 'Generation Terrorists' and the orchestral sweep of 'Everything Must Go'. After delay and difficulties getting started, the record has come together really quickly over the last few months through a surge of creativity and some old school hard work." It is the first album to be recorded at the "Door to the River" studio.

In January 2018, Manic Street Preachers signed a publishing contract with Warner/Chappell Music, leaving their longtime home Sony/ATV Music Publishing.

On the album, the Manics launched their first single "International Blue" as a download on 8 December 2017. The second single "Distant Colours" was released, also as a download, on 16 February 2018. About the first single the band said that there's was certain naive energy and widescreen melancholia on the song that is reflected through the whole album, comparing it to Motorcycle Emptiness. Furthermore, the album focused on "(...)things that make your life feel a little bit better. Rather than my internalised misery, I tried to put a sense of optimism into the lyrics by writing about things that we find really inspiring." Said Wire, taking inspiration from David Bowie and seen as almost an escape and a wave of optimism, just like the previous album was described.

On the other hand, "Distant Colours" was written by James Dean Bradfield, rather than Nicky Wire, and inspired by disenchantment and Nye Bevan's old Labour. He said: "Musically, the verse is downcast and melancholic and the chorus is an explosion of disillusionment and tears." The third single "Dylan & Caitlin" was released as a download on 9 March 2018. The fourth single "Liverpool Revisited" is about a magical day in the city, Nicky added that: "It was on the Everything Must Go (anniversary) tour and I got up really early at sunrise to walk around Liverpool, polaroid camera in hand on a balmy day. It sounds clichéd I know, but Liverpool in the sun does take on a hypnotic quality, with the Mersey and the stone." The band also revealed that they were to support Guns N' Roses during their summer tour. The fifth and final single, "Hold Me Like a Heaven", was released as a download on 4 May 2018. Wire said that the song was inspired musically by David Bowie's Ashes to Ashes, something that the band wanted to write about, and Nicky thinks that this the closest that the band is going to get, sharing also that lyrics were informed by the work of Philip Larkin.

The album sold around 24,000 copies in the first week, entering the UK Albums Chart at number 2, despite being number 1 during the week. It was the highest new entry on the chart, and on physical sales the album peaked at number 1, both on CD and vinyl.

In October 2018, the band announced a twentieth-anniversary collector's edition re-release of This Is My Truth Tell Me Yours. It was made available on digital, CD, and vinyl, with the CD edition featuring bonus demos, live rehearsal recordings, remixes, and B-sides. The album was launched on 7 December 2018 and to promote it, the band went on tour in Spring and Summer 2019, performing the album in full alongside other content.

In March 2020, the Manics announced a deluxe reissue of their Gold Against the Soul album for release on 12 June 2020. Bonus content included previously unreleased demos, B-sides from the era, remixes, and a live recording, while the CD was released alongside a book of unseen photographs from the era with handwritten annotations and lyrics from the band. The next day, the unnamed follow-up album to Resistance is Futile, their fourteenth overall, was confirmed to NME alongside Bradfield's second solo album. The group's album, including a track called "Orwellian", was described as "expansive" and is due for release in Summer 2021.

On 14 May 2021, the Manics announced the title of their fourteenth studio album: The Ultra Vivid Lament.  The first single from the album, "Orwellian", was released on the same day. "The Secret He Had Missed", the second single from the album, was released on 16 July 2021. The Ultra Vivid Lament was released on 10 September 2021 and received generally positive reviews from critics: on Metacritic, the album has a weighted average score of 78 out of 100 based on 12 reviews, indicating "generally favorable reviews".  The album sold 27,000 copies in the first week, granting the band their second UK Number 1 album as they narrowly beat Steps to the number 1 spot.

In May and June 2022, Manic Street Preachers opened for The Killers in some of their UK tour dates.

In September 2022, the Manics announced a co-headlining tour of United States and Canada with Suede for November 2022, which would be the first time the two bands would share the stage since they toured Europe together in 1994.

Solo work 
In late 2005, both Bradfield and Wire announced that they intended to release solo material before a new album by the band. A free download of Nicky Wire's debut solo offering I Killed the Zeitgeist was posted on the band's website for just one day, Christmas Day 2005, while "The Shining Path" was released exclusively on iTunes for download. Also, a promotional album sampler had been sent out to the press and certain other people which included "I Killed the Zeitgeist", "Goodbye Suicide", "Sehnsucht", and "Everything Fades".

The album was officially released in September 2006. It charted at No. 130 in the UK. The sound of the album, which Nicky referred to as his "nihilistic anti-everything album", was inspired by, among others, Neu!, the Plastic Ono Band, Einstürzende Neubauten, the Modern Lovers, Richard Thompson and Lou Reed. Only one official single was released, "Break My Heart Slowly", which charted at No. 74. Nicky toured small intimate venues across the UK with his band the Secret Society.

Bradfield's solo album, The Great Western, was released in July 2006, to positive reviews from critics. It reached No. 22 in the UK. The sound of the album was inspired by, among others, Jeff Beck, Badfinger, Simple Minds and McCarthy. Two singles were released: "That's No Way to Tell a Lie" (No. 18) in July, which was also the background music to the BBC's Match of the Day's 'Goal of the Month' competition, and then "An English Gentleman" (No. 31) in September. The latter is in remembrance of the first Manics manager Philip Hall, who died from cancer in 1993 and to whom The Holy Bible had been dedicated. The initial pressings of the red 7" single were made with black vinyl, some of which were sent out to distributors by mistake. James toured the album with a band that included Wayne Murray, who would subsequently play the second guitar for Manics live performances. James's solo gigs featured covers of the Clash songs "Clampdown" and "The Card Cheat", both from the album London Calling.

In a later interview, when the band were collectively asked what they had learned from making a solo album, Sean Moore dryly quipped "Not to do one".

In March 2020, Bradfield was confirmed to be working on a second album while the band took a short break, while Wire was also considering more solo content. That June, two tracks by Bradfield, "There'll Come a War" and "Seeking the Room With the Three Windows", were released digitally. The album title was announced as Even in Exile the next week alongside the launch of its first single, "The Boy From the Plantation", and the album was released on 14 August 2020. The album was generally well-received and peaked at no.6 in the UK Albums Chart

Collaborations and covers 

The band released a split single in 1992 with the Fatima Mansions, a rock cover of "Suicide Is Painless", which became their first UK Top 10 hit. They have recorded many cover versions of songs by other artists, primarily as B-sides for their own singles. Bands and artists to whom the group have paid tribute in this way include the Clash, Guns N' Roses, Alice Cooper, Happy Mondays, McCarthy, Chuck Berry, Faces and Nirvana.

The band's first musical appearance since Edwards' departure was recording a cover of "Raindrops Keep Fallin' on My Head" for The Help Album, a charity effort in 1995 in support of aid efforts in war-torn Bosnia and Herzegovina.

The Lightning Seeds' song "Waiting for Today to Happen", from their fifth album, Dizzy Heights (1996), was written by Nicky Wire and Ian Broudie. That same year, James Dean Bradfield and Dave Eringa produced Northern Uproar's first single, "Rollercoaster/Rough Boys". The 808 State song "Lopez" (1997) features lyrics by Wire and vocals by Bradfield. It is featured on their greatest hits album, 808:88:98. Kylie Minogue's sixth album, Impossible Princess (1997), features two songs co-written and produced by the Manics: "Some Kind of Bliss" (Bradfield, Minogue and Sean Moore) and "I Don't Need Anyone" (Bradfield, Jones and Minogue) were produced by Bradfield and Dave Eringa. Bradfield provided backing vocals, bass guitar and production for the Massive Attack song "Inertia Creeps" (1998), which features on their successful third album, Mezzanine. Patrick Jones's album of poetry set to music, Commemoration and Amnesia (1999), features two songs with music written by Bradfield: the title track and "The Guerilla Tapestry". Bradfield plays the guitar on both songs. Furthermore, the track "Hiraeth" features a section called "Spoken Word", in which Nicky Wire talks about Welsh identity.

In February 2006, the band contributed a cover version of "The Instrumental" to the album Still Unravished: A Tribute to the June Brides.

In February 2008, the Manics covered Rihanna's hit pop song "Umbrella". Their version appeared on a CD titled NME Awards 2008 given away free with a special souvenir box-set issue of NME magazine, which went on sale 27 February. Additionally, the Manics' version of the song was made available on iTunes from 5 March 2008. Despite being chart-eligible (it reached number 47 in the UK), the release was not intended as an official single. Two further versions (the Acoustic and Grand Slam mixes) were later made available on iTunes and now comprise a three-track Umbrella EP.

James Dean Bradfield and Nicky Wire contributed an original song, "The Girl from Tiger Bay", to Shirley Bassey's 2009 studio album, The Performance.

Musical style and influences 
Manic Street Preachers' music has been variously described as 
alternative rock, Britpop, hard rock glam rock, pop rock, punk metal, and punk rock.

The band have stated that the Clash were "probably our biggest influence of all". When they saw them on television, "we thought it was fantastic and got really excited. They were the catalyst for us". In addition, they have cited artists including Aerosmith, Alice in Chains, Electric Light Orchestra, Rory Gallagher, Gang of Four, Guns N' Roses, Joy Division, Magazine, PiL, the Red Hot Chili Peppers, Siouxsie and the Banshees, Skids, Bruce Springsteen, and Wire, as influential or inspirational to their music. Bradfield's guitar hero is guitarist John McGeoch: "He taught me, you can have that rock'n'roll swagger, but still build something into it that's really unsettling, and can cut like a razor blade".

Alluding to the band's early relationship with Britpop, Cam Lindsay of Canadian music publication Exclaim! opined that "Britpop was rising, the Manics were offering the polar opposite: a bleak, uncompromising work that wanted nothing to do with the party".

Band members 

Current members
 James Dean Bradfield – lead and backing vocals, lead guitar, piano, keyboards (1986–present), rhythm guitar (1988–1989, 1995–present)
 Nicky Wire – bass, piano, backing and lead vocals (1988–present), rhythm guitar (1986–1988)
 Sean Moore – drums, percussion, trumpet, backing vocals (1986–present)

Former members
 Miles "Flicker" Woodward – bass (1986–1988)
 Richey Edwards – rhythm guitar, backing vocals (1989–1995; disappeared in 1995; declared dead in 2008)

Current touring musicians
 Wayne Murray (Thirteen:13) – rhythm guitar, backing vocals (2006–present)
 Nick Nasmyth – keyboards (1995–2005, 2013–present)
 Gavin Fitzjohn – rhythm guitar, backing vocals (2018–present)

Former touring musicians
 Dave Eringa – keyboards (1993–1995)
 Greg Haver – rhythm guitar, percussion (2002–2003)
 Anna Celmore – piano (2002–2003)
 Guy Massey – rhythm guitar (2004–2005)
 Sean Read – piano, keyboards, percussion, saxophone (2006–2012)
 Richard Beak – bass (2018)

Timeline

Discography 

 Generation Terrorists (1992)
 Gold Against the Soul (1993)
 The Holy Bible (1994)
 Everything Must Go (1996)
 This Is My Truth Tell Me Yours (1998)
 Know Your Enemy (2001)
 Lifeblood (2004)
 Send Away the Tigers (2007)
 Journal for Plague Lovers (2009)
 Postcards from a Young Man (2010)
 Rewind the Film (2013)
 Futurology (2014)
 Resistance Is Futile (2018)
 The Ultra Vivid Lament (2021)

Awards and nominations 
Best Art Vinyl Awards

The Best Art Vinyl Awards are yearly awards established in 2005 by Art Vinyl Ltd to celebrate the best album artwork of the past year. 

|-
| 2007
| Send Away the Tigers
| Best Vinyl Art
| 

Brit Awards

The Brit Awards are the British Phonographic Industry's annual popular music awards. Manic Street Preachers has received four awards from eight nominations.

|-
|rowspan="4"|1997
|Manic Street Preachers
|British Group
|
|-
|Everything Must Go
|British Album of the Year
|
|-
|rowspan="2"|"A Design for Life"
|British Single of the Year
|
|-
|British Video of the Year
|
|-
|rowspan="3"|1999
|Manic Street Preachers
|British Group
|
|-
|This Is My Truth Tell Me Yours
|British Album of the Year
|
|-
|"If You Tolerate This Your Children Will Be Next"
|British Single of the Year
|
|-
|2000
|"You Stole the Sun from My Heart"
|British Single of the Year
|
|}

GAFFA Awards

|-
|1998
|"If You Tolerate This Your Children Will Be Next"
|Årets Udenlandske Hit
|
|}

Hungarian Music Awards

The Hungarian Music Awards have been given to artists in the field of Hungarian music since 1992.

|-
|2010
|Journal for Plague Lovers
|rowspan="3"|Alternative Music Album of the Year
|
|-
|2014
|Rewind the Film
|
|-
|2015
|Futurology
|
|}

Mercury Prize

The Mercury Prize is an annual music prize awarded for the best album released in the United Kingdom by a British or Irish act.

|-
|1996
|Everything Must Go
|rowspan="2"|Album of the Year
|
|-
|1999
|This Is My Truth Tell Me Yours
|
|}

NME Awards

The NME Awards is an annual music award show in the United Kingdom.

|-
| 1996
| rowspan=2|Manic Street Preachers 
| Best Band 
| 
|-
|rowspan="3"|1997
|Best Live Act
|
|-
|Everything Must Go
|Best LP
|
|-
|"A Design for Life"
|Best Track
|
|-
|1998
|rowspan=2|Manic Street Preachers
|rowspan=2|Best Band
| 
|-
|rowspan="4"|1999
|
|-
|This Is My Truth Tell Me Yours
|Best Album
|
|-
|rowspan="2"|"If You Tolerate This Your Children Will Be Next"
|Best Track
|
|-
|Best Music Video
|
|-
|rowspan=4|2000
| "A Design for Life"
| Best Ever Single
| 
|-
| The Holy Bible
| Best Album Ever 
| 
|-
| rowspan="4"|Manic Street Preachers
| Best Band Ever
| 
|-
| Best Band
| 
|-
|2001
|Best Rock Act
|
|-
|2008
|Godlike Genius Award
|
|-
|2010
|Journal for Plague Lovers
|Best Album Artwork
|
|-
|2012
|National Treasures - The Complete Singles
|rowspan="2"|Reissue of the Year
|
|-
|rowspan="2"|2013
|Generation Terrorists
|
|-
|Manic Street Preachers
|Best Fan Community
|
|-
|2015
|The Holy Bible
|Reissue of the Year
|
|}

Q Awards

The Q Awards are the UK's annual music awards run by the music magazine Q.

|-
|1996
|Everything Must Go
|Best Album
|
|-
|1998
|rowspan="6"|Manic Street Preachers
|rowspan="4"|Best Act in the World Today
|
|-
|1999
|
|-
|2000
|
|-
|rowspan="2"|2001
|
|-
|Best Live Act
|
|-
|2006
|Merit Award
|
|-
|rowspan="2"|2007
|"Your Love Alone Is Not Enough"
|Best Track
|
|-
|Send Away the Tigers
|Best Album
|
|-
|2011
|Manic Street Preachers
|Greatest Act of the Last 25 Years
|
|-
|2012
|Generation Terrorists
|Classic Album
|
|-
|2013
|"Show Me the Wonder"
|Best Video
|
|-
|2014
|Futurology
|Best Album
|
|-
|2017
|Manic Street Preachers
|Inspiration Award
|
|}

Žebřík Music Awards

!Ref.
|-
| rowspan=3|1998
| Manic Street Preachers
| Best International Group
| 
| rowspan=3|
|-
|This Is My Truth Tell Me Yours
| Best International Album
|
|-
| "If You Tolerate This Your Children Will Be Next"
| Best International Song
| 

 Viewers' Favourite Album of All Time (The Holy Bible) – Newsnight
 15th Best Album of All Time (The Holy Bible) – Melody Maker
 10th Best Album Since Creation of Magazine (The Holy Bible) – Q
 18th Best Album of All Time (The Holy Bible) – Q
 10th Greatest Album of All Time (The Holy Bible) – Kerrang!
 11th Greatest Album of All Time (Everything Must Go) – Q 
 16th Best Album Since Creation of Magazine (Everything Must Go) – Q
 22nd Best British Rock Album of All Time (Everything Must Go) – Kerrang!
 One of the Best Albums of All Time (Everything Must Go) – Absolute Radio
 One of The Writers' Best Albums (Everything Must Go) of 1996 –  The Daily Telegraph
 Writers' Best Album (Everything Must Go) of 1996 – Melody Maker
 Readers' Band of 1996 (Runner-up) and Writers' Album of 1996 (Everything Must Go) – NME
 Writers' Best Live Band of 1996 – NME Brat Award
 Writers' Best Album of 1996 (Everything Must Go) – Vox
 Writers' Best Album of 1996 (Everything Must Go) – The Sunday Times
 Writers' Best Album of 1996 (Everything Must Go) – Sky
 Writers' Best Album of 1996 (Everything Must Go) and Readers' Best Album of 1996 (Everything Must Go) – Select
 Writers' Best Album of 1996 (Everything Must Go) – Music Week
 One of Writers' Top Ten Albums (Everything Must Go) of 1996 – Metal Hammer
 Writers' Album (Everything Must Go) of 1996 (Runner-up) – Kerrang!
 One of Writers' Top Five Albums (Everything Must Go) of 1996 – The Independent on Sunday

 Readers' Best Album (Everything Must Go) of 1996 – Hot Press
 Writers' Best Album (Everything Must Go) of 1996 – The Guardian
 Ivor Novello Award for Best Contemporary Song (A Design For Life), 1996
 7th Best Band of All Time – 1999 NME Best Ever Category
 7th Best Album of All Time (The Holy Bible) – 1999 NME Best Ever Category
 8th Best Single of All Time (A Design For Life) – 1999 NME Best Ever Category
 Best Internacional Rock Group – Eska Music Awards, Poland, 2008
 The MOJO Maverick Award 2009
 Songwriting Prize at the Classic Rock Roll of Honour Awards, 2011
 Ambassadors of Rock – Silver Clef Award 2012
 Musician's Union Maestro (for James Dean Bradfield) at the Classic Rock Roll of Honour Awards, 2013
 The Ivors Inspiration Award at the Ivor Novello Awards, 2015

References

Sources

External links 

 
 
 

 
1986 establishments in Wales
Cool Cymru
Brit Award winners
British pop rock music groups
British glam rock groups
Heavenly Recordings artists
Ivor Novello Award winners
Musical groups established in 1986
British musical trios
Musical quartets
NME Awards winners
Political music groups
Welsh alternative rock groups
Welsh hard rock musical groups
Welsh punk rock groups
Welsh socialists
Britpop groups
Columbia Records artists